Mokhtar Khalem (born 10 October 1944) is an Algerian footballer. He played in 13 matches for the Algeria national football team from 1967 to 1972. He was also named in Algeria's squad for the 1968 African Cup of Nations tournament.

References

External links
 

1944 births
Living people
Algerian footballers
Algeria international footballers
1968 African Cup of Nations players
Competitors at the 1967 Mediterranean Games
Mediterranean Games competitors for Algeria
Association football forwards
Footballers from Algiers
21st-century Algerian people
20th-century Algerian people